Church of Our Lady Immaculate may refer to:

 Basilica of Our Lady Immaculate, Guelph, Canada
 Our Lady Immaculate Church, Chelmsford, Essex, England
 Our Lady Immaculate and St Joseph Church, Prescot, Merseyside, England

See also
 Church of the Immaculate Conception (disambiguation)